Vera Wülfing-Leckie (1954 – 8 February 2021) was a German-born British homeopath and a translator of African literature. She lived in Africa for much of her adult life, and translated, among others, works by Boubacar Boris Diop from Senegal and Véronique Tadjo from Côte d'Ivoire. Diop's novel Doomi Golo: The Hidden Notebooks was on the shortlist for the 2017 Best Translated Book Award.

Life

Living in Germany and the UK 
Vera Wülfing was born in Tübingen, Germany. During World War II, her father Gert Wülfing, a physician, was a prisoner-of-war in Russia. Her mother Ellen, also a physician, escaped the Russians from what later became East Germany to the West. Wülfing attended primary school in Tübingen. When her parents opened a practice in Lörrach, close to the Swiss border where they felt safer, she went to the gymnasium. She received a scholarship to study in England in 1977, and studied classics and modern languages at Oxford's Wadham College. She met Ross Leckie, also a student there, whom she married in 1979. Their son Douglas was born the same year, and the family moved to Scotland in 1981, where they ran a farm. Daughter Xenia was born in 1983, and son Patrick in 1985.

Living in South Africa and Senegal 
Wülfing-Leckie began studies in medicine at the University of Dundee, where she became friends with South Africans committed to fighting apartheid, such as Edwin Cameron. The Chernobyl disaster in 1986 left her worried about the family's health, and planning to seek more safety in the southern hemisphere. The family moved to South Africa in 1989. A daughter, Alexia, was born in 1991. The couple divorced, and her husband returned to England. Wülfing-Leckie stayed and studied alternative medicine at the University of Johannesburg in 1997, completing a doctorate in homeopathy. She opened her own practice in Johannesburg.

Wülfing-Leckie met Boubacar Boris Diop, a Senegalese novelist. She moved to Senegal in 2009, where she practised homeopathy, but also began to translate literature. She translated texts by Diop to English, in 2014 the political essay L'Afrique au-delà du miroir to Africa Beyond the Mirror. In 2016, she translated the novel Doomi Golo, first written in the Wolof language. Together with El Hadji Moustapha Diop, she translated mainly from a French version, Les Petits de guenon, and the English novel was published as Doomi Golo: The Hidden Notebooks by the Michigan State University Press in the series African Humanities and the Arts. The book was on the shortlist for the 2017 Best Translated Book Award. She translated a novel by Véronique Tadjo, an author from Côte d'Ivoire, into English as In the Company of Men.

Health and death
Wülfing-Leckie was described by her former husband, Ross Leckie, as having suffered from depression for many years.

Vera Wülfing-Leckie died in the UK while visiting her children, at age 66.

References

External links 
 Vera Wülfing-Leckie goodreads.com
 Africa Beyond the Mirror Ayebia Clarke 2014 
 Best Translated Book Award 2017 shortlists, McNally Robinson 20 April 2017
 Ann Morgan: Book of the month: Boubacar Boris Diop, ayearofreadingtheworld.com

1954 births
2021 deaths
People from Tübingen
German women writers
Alumni of Wadham College, Oxford
Alumni of the University of Dundee
German emigrants to the United Kingdom
British expatriates in Senegal
British expatriates in South Africa
University of Johannesburg alumni
British translators
British women writers
German homeopaths
German translators